Edward Thornton (born 1931), better known as "Tan Tan", is a Jamaican trumpeter, whose career began in the 1950s.

Biography
Thornton was born in 1931 and attended the Alpha Boys School. In the 1950s, he played in the Roy Coulton band (the first band to play live on Jamaican radio) along with Don Drummond. He toured worldwide with the group, backing a number of jazz stars, and settled in Europe, where he played with several bands including Georgie Fame and the Blue Flames in 1964, playing on several of their hits. He also performed with Georgie Fame and another friend of Rico Rodriguez in the BBC 4 Session: The Birth of Cool. He went on to play on The Beatles' "Got to Get You into My Life", and performed with Boney M. In 1975, Thornton played horn on Andy Fairweather Low's album, La Booga Rooga. In the late 1970s and early 1980s he was part of the horn section for Aswad, as well as playing with King Sounds. He released a self-produced solo album in 1981, on which he was backed by The Cimarons. More recently he has played with Jazz Jamaica, and Ska Cubano.

Since 2008 he has played with the band Kitty, Daisy & Lewis and has featured on most of their albums. In February 2015 and autumn 2017, Thornton joined Kitty, Daisy & Lewis on their European tour accompanying a number of songs as a guest artist.

Solo discography
Musical Nostalgia for Today LP (1981), Maccabees/Rainbow
"Theme From A Summer Place" 12" single (1981), Rough Trade

References

External links
Eddie Thornton recording credits at AllMusic
Eddie 'Tan Tan' Thornton at Roots Archives

1931 births
Living people
Jamaican trumpeters
Jamaican reggae musicians
People from Spanish Town
21st-century trumpeters